Sishilichengzi is a town in Yanqi Hui Autonomous County in the Bayin'gholin Mongol Autonomous Prefecture of Xinjiang, in Northwestern China. According to the 2000 Chinese census, the town has a population of 8,722 people.

References

Populated places in Xinjiang
Township-level divisions of Xinjiang
Yanqi Hui Autonomous County